Beate Bühler (born 8 April 1964 in Stuttgart, Baden-Württemberg) is a retired female volleyball player from Germany, who competed for West Germany at the 1984 Summer Olympics in Los Angeles, United States. There she ended up in sixth place with the national squad after a loss (0-3) in the last classification match (5th/6th place) against South Korea.

Bühler competed in the beach volleyball tournament at the 1996 Summer Olympics and, alongside Danja Müsch, she claimed the gold medal at the 1994 European Championships in Almería, Spain.

References

External links
 
 
 

1964 births
Living people
German women's volleyball players
German women's beach volleyball players
Volleyball players at the 1984 Summer Olympics
Olympic volleyball players of West Germany
Beach volleyball players at the 1996 Summer Olympics
Olympic beach volleyball players of Germany
Sportspeople from Stuttgart
21st-century German women
20th-century German women